Marynivka is a village in Shakhtarsk (district) in Donetsk Oblast of eastern Ukraine.

Demographics
Native language as of the Ukrainian Census of 2001:
 Ukrainian 88.71%
 Russian 10.81%
 German 0.16%
 Other 0.32%

References

Villages in Horlivka Raion